was a district located in Tochigi Prefecture, Japan.

As of 2003, the district had an estimated population of 40,915 and a density of 150.59 persons per km2. The total area was 271.70 km2.

Towns and villages
 Kuzu
 Tanuma

Merger
 On February 28, 2005 - the towns of Kuzu and Tanuma were merged into the expanded city of Sano. Therefore, Aso District was dissolved as a result of this merger.

Former districts of Tochigi Prefecture